is a railway station in the city of Morioka, Iwate Prefecture, Japan, operated by the Iwate Ginga Railway.

Lines
Aoyama Station is served by the Iwate Ginga Railway Line, and is located 3.2 rail kilometers from the terminus of the line at Morioka Station and 538.5 rail kilometers from Tokyo Station. Trains of the Hanawa Line, which officially terminates at  usually continue on to Morioka Station, stopping at all intermediate stations, including Aoyama Station.

Station layout
Aoyama Station has two opposed elevated side platforms with the station located underneath.  The station is staffed.

Platforms

History
Aoyama Station was opened on March 18, 2006.

Passenger statistics
In fiscal 2015, the station was used by an average of 3060 passengers daily.

Surrounding area
Iwate Prefectural Gymnasium

References

External links

   

Railway stations in Iwate Prefecture
Iwate Galaxy Railway Line
Railway stations in Japan opened in 2006
Morioka, Iwate